Kaskey is a surname, which is at the same time a reduced form of McCaskey, an Americanized spelling of Kaske, and possibly altered from Koski. Notable people with the surname include:

Harry Kaskey (1901–1992), American speed skater 
Matt Kaskey (born 1997), American football player
Raymond Kaskey (born 1943), American sculptor

References

Americanized surnames